The Mohokos is the highest peak of a hill range situated in Međimurje County, northern Croatia. The hill range extends for about 20 kilometres across the northwestern part of the County (so called Upper Međimurje) in northwest-southeast direction and represents the terminal easternmost slopes of the Alps.

As the highest elevation in the County, Mohokos lies exactly 344,4 metres above the sea level. There are meadows, vineyards, orchards and groves around it. On the top there is a stone landmark with a built-in polished plaque containing the following text: "The highest geographical point in Međimurje – Mohokos 344,4 m – 26.IX.1999".

Mohokos is a popular tourist destination, especially for many admirers of hiking, hillwalking or bicycle touring.

External links
 Mohokos on the website of the Croatian Mountaineering Association
 Highest peaks in Medjimurje County do not exceed 350 metres above the sea level
 Mohokos - highest elevation point in Medjimurje County
 One of the easiest peak for climbers to reach called Mohokos
 Mohokos in the network of the cycling routes in Croatia
 Mohokos - point of climbers' interest with a nice view to the south
 Mohokos is situated in Medjimurske gorice, a wine-producing region

Tourist attractions in Međimurje County
Hills of Croatia
Landforms of Međimurje County